The Vidarbha women's cricket team is an Indian domestic cricket team representing the Vidarbha region of Maharashtra. The team has represented the state in Women's Senior One Day Trophy (List A) and  Senior women's T20 league.

References

2006 establishments in Maharashtra
Cricket in Maharashtra
Cricket in Vidarbha
Sport in Nagpur
Cricket clubs established in 2006
Women's cricket teams in India